Bussell is a surname. Notable people with the Bussel or Bussell surnames include:

 The Bussell family, early settlers in Western Australia
 John Bussell (1803–1875), of the Bussell family
 Alfred Bussell (1816–1882), of the Bussell family
 Darcey Bussell (born 1969), English ballerina
 Gerry Bussell (born 1943), American football player
 Harold Busséll, American pastor and author
 Nick Bussell (born 1983), American racing driver 
 Norm Bussell (born 1945), Australian rules footballer
 Emma van Bussel (born 1989), Australian team handball player
 Rachel Kramer Bussel (born 1975), American author, columnist, and editor

See also
Bissell (surname)
Bussell (disambiguation)